Trypanidiellus decoratus is a species of beetle in the family Cerambycidae, the only species in the genus Trypanidiellus.

References

Acanthocinini